Syphax Milton was a County Commissioner and then a member of the South Carolina House of Representatives, representing Clarendon County. He served as a county commissioner in 1874.

References

Members of the South Carolina House of Representatives

Year of birth missing
19th-century American politicians
People from Clarendon County, South Carolina
Place of birth missing
Year of death missing
Place of death missing